Rao is a genus of parasitoid wasps belonging to the family Platygastridae.

Species:
 Rao pselaphus Masner & Huggert, 1989

References

Platygastridae
Hymenoptera genera